James Colquhoun may refer to:

Sir James Colquhoun, 3rd Baronet, of Colquhoun (died c. 1680), of the Colquhoun baronets
Sir James Colquhoun, 4th Baronet, of Colquhoun (died c. 1688), of the Colquhoun baronets
Sir James Colquhoun, 1st Baronet (1714–1786), of the Colquhoun baronets
Sir James Colquhoun, 2nd Baronet (1741–1805), of the Colquhoun baronets
James Colquhoun (diplomat) (1780–1855)
Sir James Colquhoun, 3rd Baronet, of Luss (1774–1836), MP for Dunbartonshire 1799–1806
Sir James Colquhoun, 4th Baronet, of Luss (1804–1873), MP for Dunbartonshire 1837–41, Lord Lieutenant of Dunbartonshire
Sir James Colquhoun, 5th Baronet (1844–1907), of the Colquhoun baronets, Lord Lieutenant of Dunbartonshire
James Colquhoun (cricketer) (1893–1977), Scottish cricketer and British Army officer

See also

Colquhoun (surname)